El Jícaro is a town and municipality in the El Progreso department of Guatemala.

References 

Municipalities of the El Progreso Department